Batman & Robin is an action-adventure video game for the PlayStation based on DC Comics character Batman, and the 1997 film Batman & Robin. It was developed by Probe Entertainment and published by Acclaim Entertainment in conjunction with Warner Bros. Interactive Entertainment and DC Comics. It is a sequel to Batman Forever, which was based on the 1995 film Batman Forever.

Gameplay
The game uses elements of a Sandbox style game, such as real-time events, traffic simulation, and civilian population. The player can choose one of the film's three heroes, Batman, Robin or Batgirl. Each character uses a unique vehicle. Batman drives the Batmobile, Robin the Redbird motorcycle and Batgirl uses the Batblade. In the game, the player travels around Gotham City and completes various individual missions, such as preventing Mr. Freeze from robbing a bank. Most of the events are not triggered; instead, each event occurs at a certain time. For example, Mr. Freeze's bank robbery occurs at 7 p.m. The player must find clues and discover the plot with the help of the Batcomputer. If the player cannot find enough clues, the event occurs, failing the mission. Some situations are derived directly from the plot of the film, while others were conceived for the game.

Development
Acclaim originally scheduled Batman & Robin for release in the third quarter of 1997, in order to coincide with the film's theatrical release.

Reception

Like the movie, the PlayStation game was critically and commercially unsuccessful, as it received generally unfavourable reviews according to the review aggregation website GameRankings. Game Informer gave it a mixed review, over two months before it was released Stateside. IGN noted in their review, "In the end, you'll buy this game only if you're a Batman fanatic, not because it's a good game." Next Generation said, "While not in the same league as previous Acclaim licensed horrors, Batman and Robin [sic] is still pretty damn horrible." GamePro, however, said that the game "isn't a great game, but its extra-effort design shows – and hardcore Batman fans will appreciate it." There was also a version for the Game.com handheld which got worse ratings than the PlayStation version.

The game won the award for "Most Faithful Use of a Movie License" at the 1998 OPM Editors' Awards.

Notes

References

External links

1998 video games
Acclaim Entertainment games
Action-adventure games
Video games based on Batman films
Batman (1989 film series)
PlayStation (console) games
PlayStation (console)-only games
Robin (character) in other media
Single-player video games
Superhero video games
Video games based on adaptations
Video games based on films
Video games developed in the United Kingdom
Video games scored by Tim Follin
Video games set in the United States